Gerardo Antonio Zerdín Bukovec (born 11 June 1950 in Lendava) is a Slovenian priest and Apostolic Vicar of San Ramón in Peru.

Life
Gerardo Antonio Zerdín Bukovec joined the Order of Franciscans (OFM) and received the priestly ordination on 9 November 1975. Pope John Paul II appointed him on 19 January 2002 as Apostolic Coadjutor Vicar of San Ramón and titular bishop of Thucca terebenthina.  
 
The Apostolic Vicariate of San Ramón, Julio Ojeda Pascual, gave him the bishop's ordination on 14 April of that year;  Co-consecrators were Rino Passigato, Apostolic Nuncio in Peru, and Victor de la Peña Perez, Apostolic Vicar of Requena.

References

1950 births
Slovenian Roman Catholic bishops
Living people
21st-century Roman Catholic bishops in Peru
Roman Catholic bishops of San Ramón